Statue of Benjamin Franklin may refer to:

 Statue of Benjamin Franklin (Boston), by Richard Saltonstall Greenough, 1856
 Statue of Benjamin Franklin (College Hall, Philadelphia), by John J. Boyle, 1896–1899
 Statue of Benjamin Franklin (Columbus, Ohio), by James P. Anderson, 1974
 Statue of Benjamin Franklin (Portland, Oregon), by George Berry and assistants, 1942
 Statue of Benjamin Franklin (San Francisco), artist unknown, 1879
 Statue of Benjamin Franklin (Stanford University), original by Antonio Frilli, replaced by a replica by Oleg Lobykin, 2013
 Statue of Benjamin Franklin (Washington, D.C.), by Jacques Jouvenal, 1889

See also
 Benjamin Franklin National Memorial, by James Earle Fraser, 1906–1911